The 2014–15 NAGICO Super50 was the 41st season of the Regional Super50, the domestic limited-overs cricket competition for the countries of the West Indies Cricket Board (WICB). The competition was played as a standalone tournament, with all matches held in Trinidad and Tobago.

Eight teams contested the competition – the six regular teams of West Indian domestic cricket (Barbados, Guyana, Jamaica, the Leeward Islands, Trinidad and Tobago, and the Windward Islands), and two development teams (Combined Campuses and Colleges and the West Indies under-19 side). The early stages were interrupted by rain, with three matches abandoned in one group. Trinidad and Tobago were undefeated in the group stages, and were eventually joined in the final by Guyana. The final was played at Queen's Park Oval, Port of Spain, with the home team winning by 135 runs to claim its 11th domestic one-day title.

Squads

 Note: Nicholas Pooran was originally named in Trinidad and Tobago's squad for the tournament, but was replaced by Steven Katwaroo after being injured in a road accident.

Group stage

Zone A

Zone B

Finals

Semi-finals

Final

Statistics

Most runs
The top five run scorers (total runs) are included in this table.

Source: CricketArchive

Most wickets

The top five wicket takers are listed in this table, listed by wickets taken and then by bowling average.

Source: CricketArchive

References

External links
 Series home at ESPN Crincfo

2015 in West Indian cricket
2014–15 West Indian cricket season
Regional Super50 seasons
Domestic cricket competitions in 2014–15